Pete McTighe is a British screenwriter and executive producer. He is originating writer of Wentworth, a female ensemble prison drama series that won Most Outstanding and Most Popular Drama at the Logie Awards. He is the creator and writer of the BBC1 mystery thriller series The Pact and has written various television productions in the UK and internationally including Doctor Who, The Rising, Glitch, Nowhere Boys and A Discovery of Witches. McTighe has received five Australian Writers Guild Award and one Welsh BAFTA nomination for his work.

Career

Early work
McTighe was born in the United Kingdom. McTighe was invited to join the writing team at Neighbours in 2006. He wrote the show's 6000th episode, which aired as part of the 25th anniversary on 27 August 2010. In 2012, he was nominated for his first Australian Writers Guild Award (AWGIE) in the category of Best Television Serial for Episode 6231.

McTighe later wrote scripts for the ABC drama series Crownies, Tricky Business and the Seven Network drama Winners & Losers. In 2011, McTighe started writing for the BBC One drama EastEnders.

Wentworth
In 2012, it was announced McTighe would be writing a reimagining of Prisoner Cell Block H called Wentworth. McTighe was the head writer for the first series, writing six of the ten episodes. His pilot script for Wentworth was unveiled to the media in February 2013 to a positive reception. Ben Pobjie from The Age called the production "a no-holds-barred triumph". McTighe's pilot episode became the most watched non-sport program in subscription television history, and the series itself went on to sell extensively internationally and to be remade (using McTighe's scripts) in the Netherlands and Germany. The series has won dozens of awards including Most Outstanding Drama several years in a row. McTighe wrote the opening episode and the series finale of the second season, for which he received an AWGIE Award nomination. In August 2016 he was nominated for an Australian Writers Guild Award for the Wentworth Series 3 finale "Blood And Fire" and a year later he was nominated for a fifth time for the Wentworth Series 4 finale. McTighe wrote 27 key episodes of the Series across the first 8 seasons. He appeared in a cameo role in the final scene of Season 7 which saw the return of popular villain Joan Ferguson.

Doctor Who
In August 2018, McTighe was announced as one of the writers for the eleventh series of Doctor Who; his episode is the seventh in the series, titled "Kerblam!". The BBC press release quoted him as saying, "My entire television career has quite literally been an elaborate plan to get to write Doctor Who – and no one is more shocked than me that it paid off. I've been having the time of my life working with Chris, and writing for Jodie and the new team, and can't wait for everyone to see what we've been up to." In November 2019, McTighe was announced as one of the writers for the twelfth series, co-writing "Praxeus" with Chris Chibnall.

McTighe wrote the sleeve notes for many of the classic Doctor Who DVD releases during the final years of the range. In 2018 he became Content Consultant for the Doctor Who classic Blu-ray range and also wrote the booklets that accompany each box set. He writes and directs regular short films featuring classic Doctors and companions to promote the release of The Collection sets.

The Pact
McTighe created and wrote the BBC1 mystery thriller series The Pact which aired in May 2021, starring Laura Fraser, Julie Hesmondhalgh, Rakie Ayola, Eiry Thomas, Aneurin Barnard and Jason Hughes. The series was filmed in Wales. A second series was commissioned by BBC1 and was screened in October 2022 starring Rakie Ayola.

Other work
McTighe wrote episodes for the second series of The Doctor Blake Mysteries In 2014 he wrote for the BBC America supernatural/mystery series Tatau, and the comedy-drama Cara Fi. In 2015, McTighe received an AWGIE Award nomination for his work on the teen supernatural series Nowhere Boys. He also wrote scripts for the 2017 Netflix/ABC drama series Glitch. 

In June 2019, McTighe joined the second season of Sky/BBC America supernatural series A Discovery of Witches as a writer and executive producer. He also wrote an episode of the Netflix series Clickbait.

In 2021, Sky Max broadcast his supernatural thriller series The Rising.

In 2023, it was announced Bronte Pictures will produce McTighe's 1978, a period musical film about Sydney’s Gay and Lesbian Mardi Gras.

References

External links

Interview at The Perfect Blend

Year of birth missing (living people)
Living people
21st-century British male writers
British soap opera writers
British television writers
British male screenwriters
British science fiction writers
British male television writers
21st-century British screenwriters